Major General William Norman Herbert  (26 August 1880 – 	26 April 1949) was a senior British Army officer who served as colonel of the Northumberland Fusiliers and commanded the 23rd (Northumbrian) Division in the Battle of France during the Second World War.

Military career
Herbert entered the Royal Military College, Sandhurst where he was commissioned as a second lieutenant into the British Army's Northumberland Fusiliers on 11 August 1900. He saw active service in the Second Boer War from later that year, and was promoted to lieutenant on 12 December 1901. Following the end of the war in June 1902, he returned to the United Kingdom on the SS Europan which arrived at Southampton in early September.

He served in the First World War as Commanding Officer (CO) of the 1st Battalion, Northumberland Fusiliers in which capacity he captured an enemy position together with fifty-nine prisoners for which he was awarded a bar to his Distinguished Service Order in January 1919, the citation for which reads:

After attending the Staff College, Camberley, he became a staff officer at Northern Command in 1930, commander of 10th Brigade in March 1932 and General Officer Commanding (GOC) 50th (Northumbrian) Infantry Division in February 1935. He was appointed a Companion of the Order of the Bath on 1 January 1935 and colonel of the Northumberland Fusiliers on 5 July 1935.

Although he retired in February 1939, he was recalled during the Second World War as GOC 23rd (Northumbrian) Division to lead the deployment of that formation as part of the British Expeditionary Force (BEF) in the Battle of France in April 1940. He retired for a second time when the division was disbanded on 30 June 1940.

He settled in Worcestershire, and became deputy lieutenant for the county from 1946 until his death three years later in 1949.

References

Bibliography

External links
Generals of World War II

 

|-

 

|-
 

1880 births
1949 deaths
Military personnel from Warwickshire
Companions of the Order of the Bath
Companions of the Order of St Michael and St George
Companions of the Distinguished Service Order
British Army personnel of World War I
British Army generals of World War II
Graduates of the Staff College, Camberley
Royal Northumberland Fusiliers officers
Deputy Lieutenants of Worcestershire
Graduates of the Royal Military College, Sandhurst
People from the Borough of North Warwickshire
British Army major generals
British Army personnel of the Second Boer War